Livin' Proof is the debut studio album by the American hip hop duo Group Home. It was released on November 21, 1995, through FFRR/Payday Records. Recording sessions took place at D&D Studios in New York. Production was handled by Gang Starr and Big Jaz. It features guest appearances from Absaloot, Big Shug, Guru, Brainsick Enterprize and Smiley the Ghetto Child.

It featured the popular underground single "Supa Star", which peaked at number 85 on the Billboard Hot 100 in the United States. The album is known both for the instrumentals and the interplay between the lyrics of Lil' Dap and Melachi the Nutcracker.

Track listing

Notes
Track 5 features additional vocals from Jeru the Damaja

Sample credits
"Intro" contains samples from "Yesterday" by Wes Montgomery and "Ain't No Half Steppin'" by Big Daddy Kane.
"Inna Citi Life" contains samples from "Nautilus" by Bob James, "Cold Duck Time" by Les McCann and Eddie Harris, and "Serious (Ceereeus BDP Remix)" by Steady B.
"Serious Rap Shit" contains samples from "Birdland" by Weather Report, "In Our Lifetime" by Marvin Gaye, and "I Ain't Goin' Out Like That" by Cypress Hill.
"Suspended in Time" contains samples from "Pipeline" by The Incredible Bongo Band, "Touch Me (All Night Long)" by Fonda Rae and Wish, "Real Hip Hop" by Das EFX, and "Da Mystery of Chessboxin'" by Wu-Tang Clan.
"Sacrifice" contains samples from "What Do I Wish For?" by The Chi-Lites, "Breakthrough" by Isaac Hayes, and "Crack Featuring Pete the Fly" by Paul Mooney.
"Up Against the Wall (Low Budget Mix)" contains samples from "Windows of the World" by Isaac Hayes.
"Livin' Proof" contains samples from "Collage" by The Ramsey Lewis Trio and "C.R.E.A.M." by Wu-Tang Clan.
"Baby Pa" contains samples from "The Golden Apple" by Bob James.
"2 Thousand" contains samples from "I Feel Like Loving You Today" written by Isaac Hayes and performed by Donald Byrd.
"Supa Star" contains samples from "Hanging Downtown" by Cameo, "Funky President (People It's Bad)" by James Brown, "One Woman" by Isaac Hayes, "Words from the Nutcracker" and "I'm the Man" both by Gang Starr, "I Got It Made" by Special Ed, and "Who's Gonna Love You" by Muscle Shoals Horns.

Personnel
James "Lil' Dap" Heath – performer (tracks: 2-5, 7-14)
Jamal "Melachi the Nutcracker" Felder – performer (tracks: 2-8, 10-12, 14)
Keith "GuRu" Elam – performer (track 4), producer (tracks: 4, 14), executive producer
Cary "Big Shug" Guy – performer (track 4)
Absaloot – performer (track 6)
D. "Smiley the Ghetto Child" Cruz – performer (track 13)
D. "Jack the Ripper" Wood & A. "Blackstarr" Demsey (Brainsick Enterprize)  – performer (track 13)
Kendrick "Jeru the Damaja" Davis – backing vocals (track 5)
Christopher "DJ Premier" Martin – producer (tracks: 1-3, 5-7, 9-13), mixing (tracks: 1-8, 10-14), executive producer
Jonathan "Big Jaz" Burks – producer & mixing (track 8)
Eddie Sancho – engineering
Dexter Thibou – assistant engineering
Luis Tineo – assistant engineering
Tony Dawsey – mastering
Gregory Burke – design
Daniel Hastings – photography

Album chart positions

Singles chart positions

References

External links

1995 debut albums
Group Home albums
FFRR Records albums
Albums produced by Guru
Albums produced by Jaz-O
Albums produced by DJ Premier